South African Music Awards (SAMAs) are awarded in a series of categories, each of which isolate a specific contribution to music. The standard awards list nominees in each category from which a winner is selected. SAMA categories have been added and removed over time.

Special awards
There are special awards which are awarded without nominations, typically for achievements of longer than the past year, which the standard awards apply to:

Lifetime Achievement Award is a Special Merit Award presented to performers who, during their lifetimes, have made creative contributions of outstanding artistic significance to the field of recording.
International Achievement Award is a Special Merit Award presented to performers who, during their musical careers, have achieved notable international success.

Top 5 categories
The Top 5 categories are standard awards for musical works which do not restrict nominees by genre, but may do so by some other criteria:

Album of the Year is awarded to the performer and the production team of an album.
Group or Duo of the Year is awarded to a group or duo with reference to an album.
Newcomer of the Year is awarded to an artist with reference to an album.
Female Artist of the Year is awarded to a female artist with reference to an album.
Male Artist of the Year is awarded to a male artist with reference to an album.

Genre-specific categories

Afrikaans

Best Afrikaans Traditional Music Album
Best Adult Contemporary Album: Afrikaans
Best Afrikaans Gospel Album
Best Kiddies Album: Afrikaans
Best Country Music Album
Best Rock Album: Afrikaans
Best Alternative Music Album: Afrikaans
Best Pop Album: Afrikaans
Best Sokkie Dans Album
Best Afrikaans DVD

Global Charts
Best Adult Contemporary Album: English
Best Contemporary Christian Music Album
Best Kiddies Album: English
Best Rock Album: English
Best Alternative Music Album: English
Best Pop Album: English
Best Global Chart DVD

Jazz and Classical
Best Popular Classical Album
Best Instrumental Album
Best Traditional Jazz Album
Best Contemporary Jazz Album
Best Jazz/Instrumental/Popular Classical DVD

Technical and Video
Best Music Video of the Year
Best Producer
Best Engineer
Remix Of The Year
Best Album Packaging

Traditional
Best South Sotho Music (SeSotho) Album
Best Tsonga Music (XiTsonga) Album
Best Venda Music (TshiVenda) Album
Best Mbhaqanga Album
Best Maskandi Album
Best Traditional A Capella Album
Best Adult Contemporary Album: African
Best African Contemporary Gospel Album
Best African Traditional Gospel Album
Best Traditional African A Capella Gospel Album
Best Alternative Music Album: African
Best Traditional/African Adult Contemporary African DVD

Urban
Best Urban Gospel Album
Best Pop Album: African
Best Urban Pop Album
Best Urban Dance Album
Best R&B/Neo-Soul Album
Best Rap Album
Best Kwaito Album

Other awards
Record of the Year
Best Selling Album
Best Selling mobile music download

References 

 South African Music Awards website

List